Onykia carriboea, the tropical clubhook squid, is a squid in the family Onychoteuthidae, the type species of the genus Onykia. It is known with certainty only from immature specimens. The type locality of O. carriboea is the Gulf of Mexico. Onykia robsoni has been suggested as a junior synonym, owing to similarities between the species.

References

Lesueur, C.A. 1821. "Descriptions of Several New Species of Cuttle-fish". Journal of the Academy of Natural Sciences of Philadelphia 2(1): 86-101.

External links

Tree of Life web project: Onykia carriboea

Squid
Cephalopods described in 1821